Mo' Better Tracks is the third and final studio album by Japanese J-pop band Rumania Montevideo. It was released on February 6, 2002, by Giza Studio.

Background
The actual meaning of the title is "More Better Tracks".

Compared to their previous studio albums, the music style has distanced from typical country and J-pop style and aimed for rock style.

Three out of twelve tracks contain the word "Rain".

The album consists of three previously released singles: "Start All Over Again", "Hard Rain" and "Tender Rain".

"Start All Over Again" and its b-side track "My Life" from single has received completely new recording under title album version.

B-side track "Taxi" from "Tender Rain" was included in this album as well.

The sixth single "Hard Rain" was included in the compilation album Giza Studio Masterpiece Blend 2001.

On their official website was launched page with a short preview videos with the short commentaries and self liner notes by vocalist and drummer Mami.

Soon after its release, the band went into unannounced indefinite hiatus.

Charting
The album reached #49 rank in Oricon on its first week. It charted only 1 week and sold 4,700 copies.

Track listing

Source:

Personnel
Credits adapted from the CD booklet of Mo' Better Tracks.

Mami Miyoshi – vocals, songwriting, drums
Makoto Miyoshi - producer, guitar, arranging, composing
Satomi Makoshi - bass
Akiko Matsuda - keyboards, backing vocals
Kazunobu Mashima - guitar, backing vocals
Secil Minami - backing vocals
Aika Ohno – backing vocals
Ryo Tachihara - backing vocals
Maho Furukawa (4D-JAM) - backing vocals
Mika&Rika (mist a sista) - backing vocals
Keisuke Kurumatani (New Cinema Tokage) - drums
Akira Onozuka (Dimension)- piano

Hirohito Furui (Garnet Crow) - keyboard, sound designing
Satoru Kobayashi - keyboard
Yoshinori Akai - recording, mixing, manipulating
Akio Nakajima - mixing
Takayuki Ichikawa - mixing
Taku Oyabu - recording, mixing, 
Katsuki Yoshimatsu - recording
Tatsuya Okada - recording
Yousuke Nishimura - assistant engineering
Masahiro Shimada - mastering
Gan Kojima – art direction
Kanonji - producing

In media
Start All Over Again: ending theme for TV Asahi program Mokugeki Dokyun!
Hard Rain: ending theme for Tokyo Broadcasting System Television program Kinniku Banzuke
Tender Rain: ending theme for Tokyo Broadcasting System Television program CDTV

References 

2002 albums
Being Inc. albums
Giza Studio albums
Japanese-language albums
Rumania Montevideo albums
Albums produced by Daiko Nagato